The Canyon Creek Mountains are a short  long, mountain range located in southeast Catron County, New Mexico near the source of the Gila River and north of the Gila Wilderness. The Elk Mountains are adjacent northwest, where the continental divide passes from north to east on the south of the Plains of San Agustin.

Description
The range is short, only about 10 mi long, trends southwest to northeast, and merges into the eastern end of the Elk Mountains, which trend northwesterly to meet the Continental Divide.

The highest point of the range is in the northeast at East Elk Peak, .

Continental Divide
The Continental Divide undergoes an east-west stretch northwest of the mountains, and northwest of the adjacent Elk Mountains. Forest Road 30 lies north of East Elk Peak, crosses the divide twice north of the Elk Mountains, then parallels the divide as it traverses through the Tularosa Mountains. Forest Road 30 terminates at Apache Creek, NM and intersects with State Roads 12 and 32.

References

External links
East Elk Mountain Summit, mountainzone.com (coordinates)
Canyon Creek Mountains, New Mexico Ranges, UTM table

Landforms of Catron County, New Mexico
Mountain ranges of New Mexico